This article lists all the foreign language films which have been nominated for or won Academy Awards in categories other than the International Feature Film category (known before the 2019 awards as Best Foreign Language Film) itself. The Academy Awards, popularly known as the Oscars, are among the world's oldest and most prestigious film prizes. They were first handed out on May 16, 1929 by the U.S.-based Academy of Motion Picture Arts and Sciences, and have been given annually ever since. Even though a separate prize has existed for foreign language films since the 1956 Academy Awards, such films continue to be eligible for Academy Awards in other categories, including Best Picture, provided that they have been commercially released in Los Angeles County, California and that they comply with the special rules governing those categories. The French comedy À Nous la Liberté (1931) was the first foreign language film to be nominated for an Academy Award; the German-language Swiss drama Marie-Louise (1944) was the first to actually win one.

Although a Los Angeles theatrical release is not required for eligibility for the Best International Feature Film Award itself, it is a prerequisite for consideration for Academy Awards in other categories. In the past, this had enabled some foreign language films to receive nominations over multiple years, the most recent case being that of the Italian comedy-drama Amarcord (1973). Because such films were still unreleased in Los Angeles when they were submitted to the Academy, they could only be nominated in the Foreign Language Film category. However, upon their Los Angeles release, they became eligible for other Academy Awards, and often ended up receiving nominations in various categories one year after their initial Foreign Language Film nomination. Presently, such nominations over multiple years are no longer possible since the current rules of the Academy unambiguously state that: "Films nominated for the Best International Feature Film Award shall not be eligible for Academy Awards consideration in any category in any subsequent Awards year." This restriction, however, does not apply to submitted films that were not selected as nominees. The Brazilian film City of God (2002) was thus able to receive four Academy Award nominations for the 2003 Academy Awards, even though it had failed to garner a Foreign Language Film nomination as Brazil's official submission for the 2002 Academy Awards.

Winners and nominees 

Foreign films are not to be confused with foreign language films. A foreign film is a motion picture produced outside the United States, regardless of the language used in its dialogue track. A foreign language film, on the other hand, is a predominantly non-English speaking motion picture, regardless of where it was produced. Although the overwhelming majority of foreign language films are foreign, this is not always the case: in recent years, for instance, several non-English speaking American films such as The Passion of the Christ (2004), Letters from Iwo Jima (2006) or Minari (2020) have been nominated for Academy Awards (American films have never been eligible for the Best International Feature Film Award, even if none of the dialogue is in English). Such films are included in this list. On the other hand, foreign films where the majority of the dialogue is in English — such as the Indo-British co-production of Gandhi (1982) — are not taken into account. The article also includes films such as the Japanese anime Spirited Away (2001) that were initially released in their native country in a foreign language but were nominated by the Academy for the English-dubbed version under which they were shown in Los Angeles. The films are grouped by award category, and are arranged chronologically within each category. The years are listed as per Academy convention, and generally correspond to the year of film release; the ceremonies are always held the following year. The winning films are in bold and in light blue background; the presence of an Oscar statuette indicates the official recipient of the award.

Best Picture 
The Best Picture category has existed since the creation of the Academy Awards. Its name has changed several times over the years. When Grand Illusion (1937) was nominated, the name of the category was Outstanding Production; the Best Picture designation has been continuously used since the 1962 Academy Awards. Individual producers have been officially nominated for this award since the 1951 Academy Awards. Previously, the nominations went to the production companies instead.

{| cellpadding=2 cellspacing=0 border=1 style="border-collapse:collapse; border: 1px #555 solid; text-align:center" class="sortable"
|- bgcolor="#bebebe"
! width="5%" | Year
! width="18%" | Film title used in nomination
! width="18%" | Original title
! width="18%" | Award recipient(s)
! width="18%" | Country of production
! width="18%" | Language(s)
! width="5%" class="unsortable" | Notes
|- bgcolor="#ececec"
| 1938(11th)
| Grand Illusion
| La Grande Illusion
| Réalisation d'art cinématographique(production company)
| align="left" |  France
| French(some parts in German, English & Russian)
| 
|- bgcolor="#ececec"
| 1969(42nd)
| Z
| Z
| 
| align="left" |  France Algeria
| French
| 
|- bgcolor="#ececec"
| 1972(45th)
| 
| Utvandrarna
| 
| align="left" |  Sweden
| Swedish
| 
|- bgcolor="#ececec"
| 1973(46th)
| Cries and Whispers
| Viskningar och rop
| 
| align="left" |  Sweden
| Swedish
| 
|- bgcolor="#ececec"
| 1995(68th)
| 
| Il postino
| 
| align="left" |  Italy
| Italian(some parts in Spanish)
| 
|- bgcolor="#ececec"
| 1998(71st)
| Life Is Beautiful
| La vita è bella
| 
| align="left" |  Italy
| Italian(some parts in German & English)
| 
|- bgcolor="#ececec"
| 2000(73rd)
| Crouching Tiger, Hidden Dragon
| Wòhǔ Cánglóng(pinyin)臥虎藏龍(traditional Chinese)卧虎藏龙(simplified Chinese)
| 
| align="left" |  Taiwan China Hong Kong United States
| Mandarin
| 
|- bgcolor="#ececec"
| rowspan=2|2006(79th)
| Babel
| Babel
| Jon Kilik
| align="left" |  United States Mexico France
| English, Arabic, Spanish, Japanese, Japanese Sign language, Berber languages
|
|- bgcolor="#ececec"
| Letters from Iwo Jima
| Letters from Iwo Jima
| 
| align="left" |  United States
| Japanese (some parts in English)
|
|- bgcolor="#ececec"
| 2012(85th)
| Amour
| Amour
|  Margaret MenegozStefan ArndtVeit HeiduschkaMichael Katz
| align="left" |  Austria France Germany
| French
| 
|- bgcolor="#ececec"
| 2018(91st)
| Roma
| Roma
|  Gabriela RodríguezAlfonso Cuarón
| align="left" |  Mexico United States
| Spanish, Mixtec
| 
|- bgcolor="#91CFF6"
| 2019(92nd)
| Parasite
|Gisaengchung기생충(Korean)|  Kwak Sin-aeBong Joon-ho| align="left" |  South Korea| Korean| 
|- bgcolor="#ececec"
| 2020(93rd)
| Minari
| Minari
| Christina Oh
| align="left" |  United States
| Korean (some parts in English)
|
|- bgcolor="#ececec"
| 2021(94th)
| Drive My Car
| Doraibu mai kāドライブ・マイ・カー(Japanese)
| Teruhisa Yamamoto
| align="left" |  Japan
| Japanese (some parts in English, Korean Sign Language, German, Mandarin, Tagalog, Indonesian, and Korean)
| 
|- bgcolor="#ececec"
| 2022(95th)
| All Quiet on the Western Front
| Im Westen nichts Neues(German)
| Malte Grunert
| align="left" |  Germany United States
| German (some parts in French)
| 
|}

 Acting awards 

 Documentary Feature 
The Academy Award for Best Documentary Feature category has existed since 1942.

{| cellpadding=2 cellspacing=0 border=1 style="border-collapse:collapse; border: 1px #555 solid; text-align:center" class="sortable"
|- bgcolor="#bebebe"
! width="5%" | Year
! width="18%" | Film title used in nomination
! width="18%" | Original title
! width="18%" | Award recipient(s)
! width="18%" | Country of production
! width="18%" | Language(s)
! width="5%" class="unsortable" | Notes
|- bgcolor="#91CFF6"
| 1942(15th)
| Moscow Strikes Back
| Разгром немецких войск под Москвой, Razgrom Nemetskikh Voysk Pod Moskvoy
| (production company)
| align="left" |  Soviet Union
| Russian(nominated for its English-dubbed version)
|
|- bgcolor="#91CFF6"
| 1951(24th)
| 
| Kon Tiki
| Olle Nordemar (producer)
| align="left" |  Norway Sweden
| Norwegian
|
|- bgcolor="#ececec"
| 1955(28th)
| 
| Crèvecoeur
|  Jacques Dupont (director & writer)
| align="left" |  France
|French
|
|- bgcolor="#91CFF6"
| rowspan=2| 1956(29th)
| 
| Le monde du silence
|  Jacques-Yves Cousteau, Louis Malle (director & writer)
| align="left" |  France Italy
|French
|
|- bgcolor="#ececec"
| 
| Hvor bjergene sejler
|  Bjarne Henning-Jensen (director & writer)
| align="left" |  Denmark
|Danish, Greenlandic
|
|- bgcolor="#ececec"
| 1957(30th)
| 
| Torero
| Manuel Barbachano Ponce 
| align="left" |  Mexico
|Spanish, English
|
|- bgcolor="#91CFF6"
| 1959(32nd)
| 
| Serengeti darf nicht sterben
| Bernhard Grzimek (director & writer)
| align="left" |  West Germany
| German
|
|- bgcolor="#91CFF6"
| rowspan=2| 1961(34th)
| 
| Le ciel et la boue
| Arthur Cohn, René Lafuite
| align="left" |  France Liechtenstein
| French
|
|- bgcolor="#ececec"
| 
| La grande olimpiade
| Romolo Marcellini
| align="left" |  Italy
|Italian
|
|- bgcolor="#ececec"
| 1962(35th)
| 
| Alvorada
| Hugo Niebeling
| align="left" |  West Germany
|German
|
|- bgcolor="#ececec"
| 1963(36th)
| 
| Le maillon et la chaîne
| Paul de Roubaix 
| align="left"|  France
|French
|
|- bgcolor="#91CFF6"
| rowspan=3| 1964(37th)
| 
| Le monde sans soleil 
| Jacques-Yves Cousteau
| align="left"|  France Italy|French|
|- bgcolor="#ececec"
| 
| Alleman
| Bert Haanstra
| align="left"|  Netherlands
|Dutch
|
|- bgcolor="#ececec"
| 
| 14-18
| Jean Aurel
| align="left"|  France
|French
|
|- bgcolor="#ececec"
| 1965(38th)
| 
| Mourir à Madrid
| Frédéric Rossif 
| align="left"|  France
|French, English (some parts)
|
|- bgcolor="#ececec"
| 1966(39th)
| 
| Le volcan interdit 
| Haroun Tazieff
| align="left"|  France
|French
|
|- bgcolor="#91CFF6"
| 1967(40th)
| | La section Anderson| Pierre Schoendoerffer| align="left"|  France|French|
|- bgcolor="#ececec"
| 1969(42nd)
| 
| Olimpiada en México
| Alberto Isaac 
| align="left"|  Mexico
|Spanish
|
|- bgcolor="#ececec"
| 1970(43rd)
| 
| Erinnerungen an die Zukunft
| Harald Reinl 
| align="left"|  West Germany
|German
|
|- bgcolor="#ececec"
| 1971(44th)
| 
| Le chagrin et la pitié 
| Marcel Ophüls 
| align="left"|  France Switzerland West Germany
|French, German (some parts), English (some parts)
|
|- bgcolor="#ececec"
| 1972(45th)
| 
| Bij de beesten af 
| Bert Haanstra  
| align="left"|  Netherlands
|Dutch
|
|- bgcolor="#ececec"
| 1973(46th)
| 
| Schlacht um Berlin
| Bengt von zur Mühlen  
| align="left"|  West Germany
|German
|
|- bgcolor="#ececec"
| 1974(47th)
| 
| Ha-Makah Hashmonim V'Echad
| Jacques Ehrlich, David Bergman, Haim Gouri   
| align="left"|  Israel
| Yiddish, Hebrew
|
|- bgcolor="#ececec"
| 1978(51st)
| 
| Le vent des amoureux
| Albert Lamorisse   
| align="left"|  France  Iran
|French
|
|- bgcolor="#ececec"
| 1980(53rd)
|
| Der gelbe Stern
| Bengt von zur Mühlen, Arthur Cohn   
| align="left"|  West Germany  Liechtenstein
|German, English, Hebrew
|
|- bgcolor="#ececec"
| 1985(58th)
|
| Las madres de la Plaza de Mayo
| Susana Blaustein Muñoz, Lourdes Portillo  
| align="left"|  Argentina
|Spanish
|
|- bgcolor="#ececec"
| 1986(59th)
|
| Chile: Hasta Cuando?
| David Bradbury   
| align="left"|  Australia  United States
|Spanish, English (some parts)
|
|- bgcolor="#91CFF6"
| 1988(61st)
|| Hôtel Terminus| Marcel Ophüls  
| align="left"|  France West Germany  United States|French, German, Spanish, English|
|- bgcolor="#ececec"
| 1993(66th)
|
| Children of Fate: Life and Death in a Sicilian Family 
| Susan Todd, Andrew Young  
| align="left"|  United States
|Italian, English (some parts)
|
|- bgcolor="#ececec"
| 1999(72nd)
|
| Buena Vista Social Club 
| Wim Wenders, Ulrich Felsberg   
| align="left"|  Germany Cuba France United Kingdom United States
|Spanish, English (some parts)
|
|- bgcolor="#ececec"
| rowspan=2| 2001(74th)
|
| Children Underground
| Edet Belzberg    
| align="left"|  United States
|Romanian
|
|- bgcolor="#ececec"
|
| Promises
| Justine Shapiro, B.Z. Goldberg, Carlos Bolado    
| align="left"|  United States
|Arabic, Hebrew, English (some parts)
|
|- bgcolor="#ececec"
| 2002(75th)
| 
| Le Peuple Migrateur
| (director & writer)
| align="left" |  France Italy Germany Spain Switzerland
| French
|
|- bgcolor="#ececec"
| 2003(76th)
| 
| Balseros
| Carles Bosch, Josep Maria Domènech 
| align="left" |  Spain
| Spanish
|
|- bgcolor="#91CFF6"
| rowspan=2| 2004(77th)
| | Born Into Brothels: Calcutta's Red Light Kids| Ross Kauffman, Zana Briski| align="left" |  United States| Bengali, English|
|- bgcolor="#ececec"
| 
| Die Geschichte vom weinenden Kamel
| Luigi Falorni, Byambasuren Davaa 
| align="left" |  Mongolia  Germany 
| Mongolian
|
|- bgcolor="#91CFF6"
| 2005(78th)
| | La marche de l'empereur| Luc Jacquet, Yves Darondeau 
| align="left" |  France| French, English (some parts)|
|- bgcolor="#ececec"
| 2006(79th)
| 
| Iraq in Fragments
| James Longley, John Sinno
| align="left" |  United States 
| Kurdish, Arabic
|
|- bgcolor="#ececec"
| 2007(80th)
| 
| War Dance
| Andrea Nix, Sean Fine 
| align="left" |  United States 
| Acholi, English (some parts)
|
|- bgcolor="#ececec"
| 2008(81st)
| 
| The Betrayal - Nerakhoon
| Ellen Kuras, Thavisouk Phrasavath  
| align="left" |  United States 
| Lao, English
|
|- bgcolor="#ececec"
| rowspan=2| 2009(82nd)
| 
| Burma VJ: Reporter i et lukket land 
| Anders Østergaard, Lise Lense-Møller  
| align="left" |  Denmark  Sweden  Norway  United Kingdom  United States  Germany  Netherlands  Israel  Spain  Belgium  Canada
| Burmese, English
|
|- bgcolor="#ececec"
| 
| Which Way Home
| Rebecca Cammisa  
| align="left" |  United States
| Spanish, English
|
|- bgcolor="#ececec"
| 2010(83rd)
| 
| Waste Land
| Rebecca Cammisa  
| align="left" |  Brazil  United Kingdom
| Portuguese, English
|
|- bgcolor="#ececec"
| 2011(84th)
| 
| Pina
| Wim Wenders, Gian-Piero Ringel 
| align="left" |  Germany  France  United Kingdom
| German, French, English, Spanish, Croatian, Italian, Portuguese, Russian, Korean
|
|- bgcolor="#ececec"
| rowspan=2| 2012(85th)
| 
| كاميرات محطمة
| (director, producer & cinematographer)(director, producer, writer & editor)
| align="left" |  Palestine   Israel   France
| Arabic  Hebrew
|
|- bgcolor="#ececec"
| 
| The Gatekeepers
| Dror|Moreh, Estelle Fialon, Philippa Kowarsky  
| align="left" |  Israel   France
| Hebrew  English
|
|- bgcolor="#ececec"
| rowspan=2| 2013(86th)
| 
| Jagal
| (director)(producer)
| align="left" |  Denmark   Norway   United Kingdom
| Indonesian
| 
|- bgcolor="#ececec"
| 
| al midan
| (director & cinematographer)(producer)
| align="left" |  Egypt   United States
| Arabic(some parts in English)
|
|- bgcolor="#ececec"
| rowspan=2| 2014(87th)
| 
| Le Salt de le Earth
| (director, producer & writer)(director, writer & cinematographer)(producer & writer)
| align="left" |  France   Brazil   Italy
| FrenchPortuguese(some parts in English)
|
|- bgcolor="#ececec"
| 
| Virunga
| Orlando von Einsiedel, Joanna Natasegara
| align="left" |  Democratic Republic of the Congo   United Kingdom
| FrenchSwahili(English)
|
|- bgcolor="#ececec"
| rowspan=3| 2015(88th)
| 
| Tierra de Carteles
| (director & producer)(producer)
| align="left" |  Mexico   United States
| Spanish(some parts in English)
| 
|- bgcolor="#ececec"
| 
| Senyap
| (director)(producer)
| align="left" |  Denmark   Indonesia   Finland   Norway   United Kingdom   Israel   France   United States   Germany   Netherlands
| Indonesian
| 
|- bgcolor="#ececec"
| 
| Зима у вогні: Боротьба України за свободу
| (director & producer)(producer)
| align="left" |  Ukraine   United Kingdom   United States
| UkrainianRussian(some parts in English)
| 
|-
|- bgcolor="#ececec"
| 2016(89th)
| 
| Fuocoammare
| Gianfranco Rosi(director & producer)(producer)
| align="left" |  Italy
| Italian
| 
|-
|- bgcolor="#ececec"
| 2017(90th)
| 
| Visages Villages
| Agnès Varda(director)JR(director)(producer)
| align="left" |  France
| French
| 
|-
|- bgcolor="#ececec"
| 2018(91st)
| Of Fathers and Sons
| Kinder des Kalifats
| Talal Derki(director)Ansgar Frerich(producer)Eva Kemme(producer)Tobias N. Siebert(producer)
| align="left" |  Germany
| Arabic
| 
|-
|- bgcolor="#ececec"
| rowspan=4| 2019(92nd)
| The Cave
| غار
| Feras Fayyad(director)Kirstine Barfod(producer)Sigrid Dyekjær(producer)
| align="left" |  Syria   Denmark
| ArabicEnglish
| 
|-
|- bgcolor="#ececec"
| The Edge of Democracy
| Democracia em Vertigem
| Petra Costa(director)Joanna Natasegara(producer)Shane Boris(producer)Tiago Pavan(producer)
| align="left" |  Brazil 
| PortugueseEnglish
| 
|-
|- bgcolor="#ececec"
| For Sama
| إلى سماء
| Waad Al-Kateab(director and producer)Edward Watts(director)
| align="left" |  United Kingdom   United States   Syria
| Arabic
| 
|-
|- bgcolor="#ececec"
| Honeyland
| Медена земја
| Ljubomir Stefanov(director)Tamara Kotevska(director)Atanas Georgiev(producer)
| align="left" |  North Macedonia
| Macedonian  Turkish  Bosnian
| 
|-
|- bgcolor="#ececec"
| rowspan=2| 2020(93rd)
| Collective
| Colectiv
| Alexander Nanau(director and producer)Bianca Oana(producer)
| align="left" |  Romania   Luxembourg
| Romanian
| 
|-
|- bgcolor="#ececec"
| The Mole Agent
| El agente topo
| Maite Alberdi(director)Marcela Santibañez(producer)
| align="left" |  Chile   United States   Germany   Netherlands   Spain
| Spanish
| 
|-
|- bgcolor="#ececec"
| rowspan=3| 2021(94th)
| Ascension
| 登楼叹
| Jessica Kingdon(director and producer)Kira Simon-Kennedy(producer)Nathan Truesdell(producer)
| align="left" |  United States 
| MandarinEnglish
| 
|-
|- bgcolor="#ececec"
| Flee
| Flugt
| Jonas Poher Rasmussen(director)Monica Hellström(producer)Signe Byrge Sørensen(producer)
| align="left" |  United States   United Kingdom   France   Sweden   Norway   Denmark
| Danish
| 
|-
|- bgcolor="#ececec"
| Writing with Fire
| Writing with Fire
| Sushmit Ghosh(director and producer)Rintu Thomas(director and producer)
| align="left" |  India 
| Hindi
| 
|-
|- bgcolor="#ececec"
| rowspan=2|2022(95th)
| A House Made of Splinters
| Будинок зі скалок
| Simon Lereng Wilmont(director and producer)Monica Hellström(director and producer)
| align="left" |  Denmark Ukraine Sweden
| RussianUkrainian
| 
|- bgcolor="#ececec"
| All That Breathes
| All That Breathes
| Shaunak Sen(director and producer)Aman Mann(producer)Teddy Leifer(producer)
| align="left" |  India United States United Kingdom
| Hindi
|
|}

 Animated Feature Film 
The Animated Feature Film category has existed since the 2001 Academy Awards. The intended recipient(s) of this award must be designated by those responsible for the production of the film. Agreement on the designated recipient(s) has to be settled prior to the film's submission to the Academy. Unlike other Academy Awards, the Best Animated Feature Film Award therefore does not always go to the same crew member. However, the person(s) to whom it is given must always be "the key creative individual most clearly responsible for the overall achievement or a two-person team with shared and equal directing credit".

 Art Direction/Production Design 
The Production Design category, formerly named Best Art Direction until 2012, has existed since the creation of the Academy Awards. Until 1939, only one award was given. From 1940 until 1966, two awards were given, one for black-and-white films, the other for color films. The two awards were briefly merged at the 1957 and 1958 Academy Awards, and were permanently combined once again in a single category starting 1967. All the foreign language films that were nominated for the Art Direction Award between 1940 and 1966 received their nomination in the Black-and-White category, with the exception of Juliet of the Spirits (1965), which was nominated in the Color category.

 Cinematography 
The Cinematography category has existed since the creation of the Academy Awards. Until 1938, only one award was given. From 1939 until 1966, two awards were given, one for black-and-white films, the other for color films. The two awards were briefly merged at the 1957 Academy Awards, and were permanently combined once again in a single category starting 1967. However, since foreign language films were not nominated for the Cinematography Award prior to the 1966 Academy Awards, they were unaffected by the splits and mergers that took place in this category.

 Costume Design 
The Costume Design category has existed since the 1948 Academy Awards. Until 1966, two awards were given, one for black-and-white films, the other for color films. The two awards were briefly merged at the 1957 and 1958 Academy Awards, and were permanently combined once again in a single category starting 1967. All the foreign language films that were nominated for the Costume Design Award between 1948 and 1966 received their nomination in the Black-and-White category, with the exception of Gate of Hell (1953) and Juliet of the Spirits (1965), which were nominated in the Color category.

 Directing 
The Directing category has existed since the creation of the Academy Awards. Lina Wertmüller's nomination for Seven Beauties (1976) made her the first-ever woman to be nominated for the Directing Award and the only one ever nominated for a foreign language film.

 Film Editing 
The Film Editing category has existed since the 1934 Academy Awards.

 International Feature Film 

 Makeup 
The Makeup category has existed since the 1981 Academy Awards. No award was handed out at the 1983 Academy Awards.

 Music (Scoring) 
The Music (Scoring) category.

 Music (Best Original Song) 
The Music (Best Original Song) category has existed since the 1934 Academy Awards. Its name was changed from Song to Original Song starting 1975 onwards. The designation Song — Original for the Picture had previously been used between 1968 and 1972.

 Sound Mixing 
The Sound Mixing category existed from 1930 through 2019, after which it and the Sound Editing category were combined into a single award for Best Sound.

 Sound Editing 

The Sound Editing category existed from 1963 through 2019, after which it and the Sound Mixing category were combined into a single award for Best Sound.

 Visual Effects 

The Visual Effects category has existed since 1928.

 Writing (Adapted Screenplay) 

The Adapted Screenplay category has existed since the creation of the awards.

 Writing (Original Screenplay) 

The Original Screenplay category has existed since 1940.

 See also 
 Academy Award for Best International Feature Film
 List of Academy Award winners and nominees for Best International Feature Film

 Notes A: The Academy Award for Best Foreign Language Film (now International Feature Film) had not been created yet when this film received its nomination.B: Shoe-Shine (1946) won a Special Award the same year because "the high quality of this motion picture, brought to eloquent life in a country scarred by war, is proof to the world that the creative spirit can triumph over adversity".C: The Bicycle Thief (1948) won a Special Foreign Language Film Award the same year.D: Rashomon (1950) won an Honorary Foreign Language Film Award the previous year.E: Forbidden Games (1952) won an Honorary Foreign Language Film Award two years earlier.F': Gate of Hell'' (1953) won an Honorary Foreign Language Film Award the same year.

References 

General

Foreign Oscar Quandary: Academy Nixes Maria, Colombia Adds El Rey, and Other Stories from the Foreign-Lingo Category
Oscar bids from overseas lost in translation
AMPAS nixes Persepolis
THE BIG PICTURE: Oscars' foreign policy problem

External links 

Foreign
Academy Award for Best International Feature Film